Sacha Skarbek is a British songwriter and producer. He is best known for co-writing James Blunt's hit singles "You're Beautiful" and "Goodbye My Lover" as well as Miley Cyrus' hit song "Wrecking Ball". Skarbek has worked with artists such as Adele, Lana Del Rey, Jason Mraz, Tears for Fears, Duffy and many more.

Career

Early career 
Sacha Skarbek is a classically trained musician, taught by distinguished pianist Ronald Smith. He received music scholarships to Northbourne Park and The King's School, Canterbury. After graduating from Oxford Brookes University with a degree in music, Skarbek was musical director and keyboard player for Neneh Cherry, Beverley Knight, Alisha's Attic and Jon Bon Jovi.

Songwriting and production 
Skarbek played a key role in the development of James Blunt with whom he wrote the worldwide No. 1 hit "You're Beautiful".  Skarbek co-wrote six songs on the multi-platinum selling debut album "Back to Bedlam", including follow up singles "Goodbye My Lover" and "Wisemen". In 2008, Skarbek wrote "Cold Shoulder" with Adele. The song was released as a single from Adele's multi-platinum selling debut album "19". Over the years Skarbek wrote several songs on globally chart topping albums, including Jason Mraz's multi-platinum selling album "We Sing. We Dance. We Steal Things" as well as Lana Del Rey's best-selling album "Born to Die". Skarbek co-wrote Miley Cyrus' "Wrecking Ball" with Mozella and Stephan Moccio which was later produced by Dr. Luke and Cirkut. The song topped the Billboard Hot 100 and was awarded multi-platinum around the world.

Recently, Skarbek set up his own production company "White Rope Music" which focuses on artist development.

Film music 
Skarbek scored and supervised the music for the documentary film For No Good Reason, starring Johnny Depp. He also scored and collaborated with James Walsh on the soundtrack music for a film of Chuck Palahniuk's Lullaby.

Personal life 
Skarbek was raised in an area of London. He is the son of psychotherapist Andrzej Skarbek and journalist and writer Marjorie Wallace, who was made Commander of the Order of the British Empire for founding the mental health charity SANE. His brother, Stefan Skarbek, is also a songwriter and music producer.

Discography

Awards and nominations 

|-
| 2005
| "I'm Ready"
| BMI Award
| 
|-
| 2006
| "You're Beautiful"
| Ivor Novello Award for International Hit of the Year
| 
|-
| 2006
| "You're Beautiful"
| Ivor Novello Award for Most Performed Work
| 
|-
| 2007
| "You're Beautiful"
| BMI Award
| 
|-
| 2007
| "Goodbye My Lover"
| BMI Award
| 
|-
| 2007
| "You're Beautiful"
| Grammy Award for Song of the Year
| 
|-
| 2014
| "Wrecking Ball"
| BMI Award
| 
|-
| 2014
| "Wrecking Ball"
| SOCAN Award for No. 1 Song
| 
|-
| 2016
| "Bitter Pill"
| Choice Music Prize for Irish Song of the Year
| 
|}

References

External links 
 Sacha Skarbek homepage
 Interview, HitQuarters Jul 2009

Year of birth missing (living people)
Place of birth missing (living people)
Living people
Alumni of Oxford Brookes University
British male guitarists
British male pianists
British record producers
British songwriters
British people of Polish descent
Ivor Novello Award winners
People educated at The King's School, Canterbury
Musicians from Kent